Michael Addison may refer to:

 Michael Addison, 3rd Viscount Addison (1914–1992), British civil servant and academic
  Michael K. Addison (born 1980), American murderer